The 1904 Home Nations Championship was the twenty-second series of the rugby union Home Nations Championship. Six matches were played between 9 January and 19 March. It was contested by England, Ireland, Scotland and Wales.

Table

Results

The matches

England vs. Wales

England: HT Gamlin (Blackheath), Edgar Elliot (Sunderland), AT Brettargh (Liverpool OB), EJ Vivyan (Devonport Albion), EW Dillon (Blackheath) PS Hancock (Richmond), WV Butcher (Bristol), GH Keeton (Richmond), Vincent Cartwright (Oxford Uni.), Jumbo Milton (Bedford GS), NJ Moore (Bristol), Frank Stout (Richmond) capt., Charles Joseph Newbold (Cambridge Uni.), BA Hill (Blackheath), PF Hardwick (Percy Park)

Wales: Bert Winfield (Cardiff), Teddy Morgan (London Welsh), Gwyn Nicholls (Cardiff) capt., Rhys Gabe (Llanelli), Willie Llewellyn (Newport), Dicky Owen (Swansea), Dick Jones (Swansea), Jehoida Hodges (Newport), Will Joseph (Swansea), John William Evans (Blaina), Arthur Harding (London Welsh), Alfred Brice (Aberavon), David John Thomas (Swansea), Sam Ramsey (Treorchy), George Boots (Newport)

England vs. Ireland

England: HT Gamlin (Blackheath), T Simpson (Rockcliff), AT Brettargh (Liverpool OB), EJ Vivyan (Devonport Albion), EW Dillon (Blackheath) PS Hancock (Richmond), WV Butcher (Bristol), GH Keeton (Richmond), John Daniell (Richmond) capt., Jumbo Milton (Bedford GS), NJ Moore (Bristol), Frank Stout (Richmond), Charles Joseph Newbold (Cambridge Uni.), BA Hill (Blackheath), PF Hardwick (Percy Park)

Ireland: J Fulton (NIFC), CG Robb (Queen's Uni, Belfast), James Cecil Parke (Dublin University), Harry Corley (Wanderers) capt., Gerry Doran (Lansdowne), TTH Robinson (Wanderers), FA Kennedy (Wanderers), Jos Wallace (Wanderers), Jas Wallace (Wanderers), CE Allen (Derry), Alfred Tedford (Malone), M Ryan (Rockwell College), J Ryan (Rockwell College), F Gardiner (NIFC), RS Smyth (Dublin University)

Wales vs. Scotland

Wales: Bert Winfield (Cardiff), Teddy Morgan (London Welsh), Cliff Pritchard (Newport), Rhys Gabe (Llanelli), Willie Llewellyn (Newport) capt., Dicky Owen (Swansea), Dick Jones (Swansea), Jehoida Hodges (Newport), Will Joseph (Swansea), Billy O'Neill (Cardiff), Arthur Harding (London Welsh), Alfred Brice (Aberavon), Harry Vaughan Watkins (Llanelli), Edwin Thomas Maynard (Newport), David Harris Davies (Neath)

Scotland: WT Forrest (Hawick), HJ Orr (London Scottish), GE Crabbie (Edinburgh Acads), LM MacLeod (Cambridge University), JS MacDonald (Edinburgh University), AA Bissett (RIE College), ED Simson (Edinburgh University), GO Turnbull (Edinburgh Wanderers), AG Cairns (Watsonians), WE Kyle (Hawick), EJ Ross (London Scottish), Mark Coxon Morrison  (Royal HSFP) capt., WP Scott (West of Scotland), David Bedell-Sivright (West of Scotland), LHI Bell (Edinburgh Acads)

Ireland vs. Scotland

Ireland: J Fulton (NIFC), CG Robb (Queen's Uni, Belfast), James Cecil Parke (Dublin University), Harry Corley (Wanderers) capt., JE Moffatt (Old Wesley), TTH Robinson (Wanderers), ED Caddell (Dublin University), Jos Wallace (Wanderers), Jas Wallace (Wanderers), CE Allen (Derry), Alfred Tedford (Malone), M Ryan (Rockwell College), P Healey (Limerick), F Gardiner (NIFC), GT Hamlet (Dublin University)

Scotland: WT Forrest (Hawick), HJ Orr (London Scottish), Alec Boswell Timms (Cardiff), LM MacLeod (Cambridge University), JS MacDonald (Edinburgh University), Jimmy Gillespie (Edinburgh Acads), ED Simson (Edinburgh University), JB Waters (Cambridge University), AG Cairns (Watsonians), WE Kyle (Hawick), WM Milne (Glasgow Acads), Mark Coxon Morrison  (Royal HSFP) capt., WP Scott (West of Scotland), David Bedell-Sivright (West of Scotland), LHI Bell (Edinburgh Acads)

Ireland vs. Wales

Ireland: MF Landers (Cork Constitution), CG Robb (Queen's Uni, Belfast), James Cecil Parke (Dublin University), GAD Harvey (Wanderers), HB Thrift (Dublin University), Louis Magee (Bective Rangers), FA Kennedy (Dublin University), Jos Wallace (Wanderers), Henry Millar (Monkstown), CE Allen (Derry) capt., Alfred Tedford (Malone), RW Edwards (Malone), HJ Knox (Dublin University), F Gardiner (NIFC), GT Hamlet (Dublin University)

Wales: Bert Winfield (Cardiff), Teddy Morgan (London Welsh), Cliff Pritchard (Newport), Rhys Gabe (Llanelli), Willie Llewellyn (Newport) capt., Dicky Owen (Swansea), Dick Jones (Swansea), Sid Bevan (Swansea), Howell Jones (Neath), Billy O'Neill (Cardiff), Arthur Harding (London Welsh), Alfred Brice (Aberavon), Harry Vaughan Watkins (Llanelli), Edwin Thomas Maynard (Newport), Charlie Pritchard (Newport)

Scotland vs. England

Scotland: WT Forrest (Hawick), JE Crabbie (Edinburgh Acads), Alec Boswell Timms (Cardiff), LM MacLeod (Cambridge University), JS MacDonald (Edinburgh University), Jimmy Gillespie (Edinburgh Acads), ED Simson (Edinburgh University), JB Waters (Cambridge University), AG Cairns (Watsonians), WE Kyle (Hawick), WM Milne (Glasgow Acads), Mark Coxon Morrison  (Royal HSFP) capt., WP Scott (West of Scotland), David Bedell-Sivright (West of Scotland), HN Fletcher (Edinburgh University)

England: HT Gamlin (Blackheath), T Simpson (Rockcliff), AT Brettargh (Liverpool OB), EJ Vivyan (Devonport Albion), EW Dillon (Blackheath) PS Hancock (Richmond), WV Butcher (Bristol), GH Keeton (Richmond), John Daniell (Richmond) capt., Jumbo Milton (Bedford GS), NJ Moore (Bristol), Frank Stout (Richmond), Charles Joseph Newbold (Cambridge Uni.), Vincent Cartwright (Blackheath), PF Hardwick (Percy Park)

Bibliography

External links

1903-04
1903–04 in British rugby union
1903–04 in English rugby union
rugby union
rugby union
Home Nations Championship
Home Nations Championship
Home Nations Championship
1903–04 in Scottish rugby union